Sediliopsis is a genus of sea snails, marine gastropod mollusks in the family Pseudomelatomidae.

This genus was long considered as extinct since the late Miocene, until Sedeliopsis riosi was discovered off Brazil, obviously a relict-pocket occurrence.

Species
Species within the genus Sediliopsis include:
 † Sediliopsis angulata (Martin, 1904)
 † Sediliopsis aphanitoma (Dall, 1892)
 † Sediliopsis calvertensis (Martin, 1904) 
 † Sediliopsis chowanensis (J. Garnder, 1948)
 † Sediliopsis distans (Conrad, 1862)
 † Sediliopsis gracilis (Conrad, 1830) 
 † Sediliopsis incilifera (Conrad, 1834)
 † Sediliopsis ondulum (Fargo, 1953)
 † Sediliopsis patuxentia (Martin, 1904)
 Sediliopsis riosi Tippett, 1995

References

External links
 
 Bouchet, P.; Kantor, Y. I.; Sysoev, A.; Puillandre, N. (2011). A new operational classification of the Conoidea (Gastropoda). Journal of Molluscan Studies. 77(3): 273-308
 Worldwide Mollusc Species Data Base: Pseudomelatomidae

 
Pseudomelatomidae
Gastropod genera